Giorgio Armani S.p.A., commonly known as Armani, is an Italian luxury fashion house founded in Milan by Giorgio Armani which designs, manufactures, distributes and retails haute couture, ready-to-wear, leather goods, shoes, accessories, and home interiors. Armani licenses its name and branding to Luxottica for eyewear; L'Oréal for fragrances and cosmetics; and Fossil for watches and jewelry. It is considered Italy's second-biggest fashion group behind Prada.

History
Armani and his partner, architect Sergio Galeotti, founded Giorgio Armani SpA in 1975, reportedly on money from the sale of Armani's Volkswagen.

The company signed a license with Gruppo Finanziario Tessile (GFT) in 1978. It partnered with L'Oreal on a licensing agreement for the production and distribution of fragrances, cosmetics and beauty products in 1980 and with Luxottica for eyewear in 1988. Armani also entered into a manufacturing and distribution license with Simint in 1991 when the company launched A|X Armani Exchange. By 1993, the Armani name was represented by 23 licensees and two large joint ventures in Japan.

By the 1990s, the company's strategy was to cancel licenses and take production in-house in a bid to exert more control over quality and distribution. Manufacturing arrangements later brought back in-house include the acquisition of Antinea (1990), Simint (1996) and Intai (1998). In 2000, after buying factories from GFT, Armani formed a joint venture with Zegna for the production and distribution of the Collezioni men's collection. Armani also increased to 85 percent its share in the joint venture in Japan with Itochu.

Also in the early 2000s, Armani opened five megastores designed by Massimiliano and Doriana Fuksas, starting with the opening of the Armani/Manzoni store in Milan in 2000, which carries all of the company's brands. Other such venues are in Hong Kong (Armani/Chater House, opened in 2002), Munich (Armani/Fünf Höfe, opened in 2003), Tokyo (Armani/Ginza Tower, opened in 2007) and New York City (Armani/Fifth Avenue, opened in 2009).

From 2003 until 2012, Safilo Group held the exclusive license for Armani-branded eyewear before losing it again to Luxottica until 2037. Beginning in 2007, the company teamed up with Samsung to develop a line of high-end electronic goods.

In 2007, Giorgio Armani confirmed to Reuters that he had been approached by Beiersdorf in 2005 about a potential merger but had since been too distracted by other projects to pursue that option. In 2016, he confirmed he had established the Giorgio Armani Foundation which, while aiming to fund social projects, is also to “safeguard the governance assets of the Armani Group and ensure that these assets are kept stable over time." By 2017, the company was seen as a prime candidate for a stock market listing. In 2021, Giorgio Armani ruled out merging with either LVMH and Kering and reportedly also ruled out an offer by Stellantis to acquire a minority stake.

In February 2020, Armani was the first fashion brand to decide to close its runway shows to the public amid the beginning COVID-19 pandemic, holding the event without audience. By March 2020, all of its Italian production plants started producing single use medical overalls.

In 2021, luxury yacht maker The Italian Sea Group announced that Giorgio Armani SpA would invest in the company's IPO at the Italian Bourse.

Brands

Giorgio Armani
Giorgio Armani is a high-end label specializing in men's and women's ready-to-wear, accessories, glasses, cosmetics, and perfumes. It is available only in Giorgio Armani boutiques, specialty clothiers and select high-end department stores. The logo is a curved "G" completing a curved "A", forming a circle.

In 2016, the fashion house stopped using animal fur in all of its collections, citing the availability of "valid alternatives at our disposition that render the use of cruel practices unnecessary as regards animals."

According to The Wall Street Journal and other sources, in addition to couture line Armani Privé, Giorgio Armani and Emporio Armani are the company's ready-to-wear lines that show at Milan fashion week. In addition, selling at lower prices are Armani Collezioni, Armani Exchange and Armani Jeans.

Emporio Armani

Emporio Armani is the second brand of the Armani family and features ready-to-wear and runway collections. Emporio Armani focuses on trends and modern traits. Also, Emporio Armani, along with Giorgio Armani, are the only two ready-to-wear brands that are mainly designed by Giorgio Armani himself, and has a spotlight at Milan Fashion Week every year while Armani Collezioni, Armani Jeans, and Armani Exchange do not. Emporio Armani products are usually only sold in freestanding Emporio Armani boutiques and on the official website.

Over the years, Emporio Armani underwear campaigns featured David Beckham (2008–2010), Victoria Beckham (2009), Cristiano Ronaldo (2010), Megan Fox (2010), Rihanna (2011) and Rafael Nadal (2011). The brand's watches ad campaign has featured Shawn Mendes (2019), among others. Several campaigns were photographed by Mert Alas and Marcus Piggott.

Emporio Armani also teamed up with Reebok to create fashion shoes under the label EA7.

Emporio Armani is also the official kit supplier of Italian football side SSC Napoli under its EA7 brand.

Armani Collezioni

Armani Collezioni (formerly Giorgio Armani Le Collezioni) was the diffusion line of Giorgio Armani that retails at a lower price than Giorgio Armani and the haute couture line, Armani Privé. The logo was usually displayed black written on a white label, but often varies. "Armani" being larger and "Collezioni" underneath it. It has provided made-to-measure tailored suits and shirts where every element can be chosen. In addition to being sold in the two freestanding boutiques (which feature the Collezioni line exclusively) in Milan and Paris, Armani Collezioni usually sold in department stores and outlets while Giorgio Armani and Emporio Armani only sold in freestanding boutiques. A sporty line of the label has appeared named "Armani Collezioni Active" in the same way as the EA7 line from Emporio Armani line.

Armani Exchange

A|X Armani Exchange was launched in 1991 in the U.S. It retails fashion and lifestyle products and is known for its occasionally provocative ad campaigns. Inspired by street-chic culture and dance music, it is targeted as the more accessible Armani brand.

To accelerate development of the nascent line, Giorgio Armani co-established the joint venture company Presidio Holdings Ltd in 2005 alongside Como Holdings, the company owned by the Singaporean tycoon Ong Beng Seng that, since 1994, has held the production and distribution license for A/X Armani Exchange in the United States, Canada, Central and South America and Asia-Pacific.

Initially, the company held 25% of Presidio Holdings, with the remaining 75% being in the hands of Como Holdings. In 2008, Giorgio Armani acquired an additional 25% stake. In 2014, it acquired the remaining 50% "ensuring full ownership of the brand, which has 270 stores and over 3,000 employees", the company said in a statement.

Armani Exchange products are available exclusively in 270 stores in 31 countries and on the brand's website.

Armani Junior and Armani Baby

Armani designs products for babies, toddlers, and teenagers under the labels Armani Junior and Armani Baby. The Armani Junior brand was introduced in 1979. The junior line consists of baby clothing, accessories, T-shirts, pullovers, suits, shoes, hats, shirts, belts, bags, and underwear.

Armani Junior has 167 independent boutiques around the globe, which only sell the sub-label. The label is also sold in other stores by the label including Armani/Casa, Armani Jeans or Emporio Armani. In total, 308 independent and franchise Armani stores sell the Armani Junior and Armani Baby products throughout the whole world. In addition, the label is available in selected department stores everywhere in the world, for example Neiman Marcus, Saks Fifth Avenue, Breuninger and Peek & Cloppenburg.

In May 2014, actress Quvenzhané Wallis was named the face of Armani Junior.

Armani/Casa

The Armani label also consists of a furniture and home collection called Armani/Casa. While the Italian word "casa" usually means "house", its usage here instead means "at home". Giorgio Armani launched his interior design collection in 2000 with a flagship store opening in Milan, Italy the same year. When Armani was asked about why he wanted a furniture line, Armani said that he wanted "people to design their own private home". "Designing this furniture and home collection helped me to stimulate my creative and artistic vein", Armani said. Critics responded very positively to the Armani/Casa label calling the style "simply elegant, a little retro with Ethno elements" to it. A lot of critics also liked the fact that there are only a "few ornaments" used but with "artistic detail" which seem to have a "tremendous effect on the style and furniture" itself.

Armani collaborates with Rubelli and the Molteni Group to build the home collection. As the Architectural Digest reported in February 2012, that Armani/Casa includes state-of-the-art kitchens, sold under the Armani/Dada name – a partnership with Molteni Group, as well as luxurious fabrics produced in collaboration with Rubelli. Armani/Roca is a partnership with Roca, which provides Giorgio Armani with bathroom furniture and accessoires. The sub-label consisting of variegated products is sold in 183 independent Armani stores as well as selected retailers throughout the world.

Armani/Casa is used in the Armani hotels, equipped John Mayers New York City apartment and decorated the scenes for the 2013 film Paranoia.

Armani/Dolci

A confectionery is also under the Armani name. The brand was established in 2002. For the creations and collections Armani collaborates with the Italian chocolate manufacturer Guido Gobino.

Armani/Dolci sells chocolates, jams, honey, tea, shortbread biscuits, sugar and pralines. The brand is mostly part of other Armani stores but has got an independent boutique in Taichung, Taiwan. In total, 152 stores sell the Armani/Dolci products.

Over the years, Armani created various limited Armani/Dolci products to celebrate special occasions. For example, Armani designed chocolate Easter eggs, heart-shaped boxes with red, pink and lilac chocolate truffles for Valentine's Day, as well as a Ramadan collection for the Muslim holiday featuring refined colors of Islamic art and no alcohol. In addition, Armani/Dolci sells special delicate collections for Christmas and its significant anniversaries.

The Armani/Dolci brand is well received by both critics and the public.

Armani/Fiori

The Giorgio Armani label also has a florist under its name, called Armani/Fiori. The exclusive floral service is active since 2000 in major independent flower boutiques and other Armani stores around the world.

The flowers used for the Armani/Fiori arrangements come mostly from the Netherlands. The label uses a large selection of orchids, as well as exotic and tropical flowers alongside more traditional flowers such as hydrangeas, roses and peonies. Each collection is personally designed by Giorgio Armani himself as he wants to transport an "Asian feel". In addition, Armani/Fiori offers decorative elements like vases, flowerpots, candles and lanterns. For the collections, Armani uses precious materials like alabaster, black marble, lacquered wood in the shape of cylinders, cubes, and rhomboids. Giorgio Armani also designed special floral arrangements for occasions like Valentine's Day and spring collections. The labels floral arrangements are used in the Armani hotels.

Armani/Hotels
Giorgio Armani and Emaar Properties PJSC signed an agreement in 2005 for Emaar Properties PJSC to build and operate at least seven luxury hotels and three vacation resorts under the Armani name. Armani would be responsible for overseeing all aspects of the interior design and style of the hotels. The Armani hotel was opened in Burj Khalifa on April 27, 2010, comprising the bottom 39 floors of the supertall skyscraper in Dubai, United Arab Emirates. It has 160 guest rooms and suites, and 144 residences. Giorgio Armani also designed the interiors of the Armani Residences, also within the skyscraper, and its specially designed line of products from the Armani/Casa home furnishings collection and the Armani/Fiori flower arrangements. The "Burj Khalifa Armani Residences Road Show" toured Milan, London, Jeddah, Moscow and New Delhi. The London event was housed in the Armani Casa Showroom in New Bond Street.

The second club opened in 2011 in Milan. The hotel is located in a palazzo on Via Manzoni in the heart of the city.

Armani/Privé Club 
Armani operates two luxury clubs under the Armani/Privé name in both Milan and Dubai. According to its website, "Armani/Privé prides itself on primely located clubs at the cutting edge of the city’s nightlife scene, setting the bar high by attracting internationally acclaimed resident DJs that play the latest beats to a carefully selected crowd, sipping on signature cocktails."

Sponsoring and philanthropy
In 2015, Armani opened Armani/Silos, an exhibition space in Milan which has in the past which staged solo exhibitions of Larry Fink (2017), Sarah Moon (2018), Paolo Ventura (2018), Tadao Ando (2019) and Peter Lindbergh (2020).

Armani Beauty has been a major supporter of the Venice Film Festival since 2018 and was the event's main sponsor in 2019.

Also in 2019, A|X Armani Exchange became the first fashion brand to debut in the world of e-sports — professional multiplayer video game competitions — when it sponsored the Italian team Mkers for the 2019–20 season.

Among others, Armani designed suits for Italy's delegations to the 2009 FINA World Aquatics Championships and the 2012 Summer Olympics as well as for the country's national football team at the UEFA Euro 2020. Since 2021, the company has been a sponsor of the Scuderia Ferrari, supplying formal attire and travel wear to the Ferrari team's management, drivers and technicians to be worn at official events and during transfers linked to Formula One’s Grand Prix international races. The company also makes kits for Serie A football side Napoli under its EA7 brand.

Sustainability
Armani banned animal fur in 2016 and signed in 2019 the "Fashion Pact" with other major industry players to address climate change. Starting from the 2022-23 autumn/winter season, it no longer uses angora wool.

Controversy
In 1999, the New York Times and others raised concerns about a generous donation made by Giorgio Armani SpA to the Solomon R. Guggenheim Museum in New York shortly before the museum announced that it would pay homage to Armani himself with a major retrospective of his work.

In a 2014 report, Greenpeace publicly criticized Armani and other luxury brands after having found traces of chemicals that can pollute waterways in children's clothing and shoes; in response, the company committed to abolish all chemicals which could cause environmental damage to production sites by 2020. Also in 2014, Giorgio Armani SpA paid 270 million euros to Italian tax authorities to settle a dispute over payments from the group's subsidiaries abroad.

In 2015, Giorgio Armani Corp's former general counsel Fabio Silva filed a $75 million lawsuit in the New York Supreme Court against the company, accusing it of discriminating against him because of his Mexican origins and firing him for having cancer.

See also
Made in Italy

References

Further reading

External links 

 

 
Clothing brands of Italy
Clothing companies established in 1975
Design companies established in 1975
Eyewear brands of Italy
Fashion accessory brands
Haute couture
High fashion brands
Italian companies established in 1975
Italian suit makers
Jewellery companies of Italy
Jewellery retailers of Italy
Luxury brands
Perfume houses
Privately held companies of Italy
Retail companies established in 1975
Sportswear brands
Underwear brands
Watch manufacturing companies of Italy
1980s fashion
1990s fashion
2000s fashion